The Digital Services Act (Regulation (EU) 2022/2065, DSA) is a Regulation in EU law to update the Electronic Commerce Directive 2000 regarding illegal content, transparent advertising, and disinformation.

It was submitted along with the Digital Markets Act (DMA) by the European Commission to the European Parliament and the Council on 15 December 2020. The DSA was prepared by the Executive Vice President of the European Commission for A Europe Fit for the Digital Age Margrethe Vestager and by the European Commissioner for Internal Market Thierry Breton, as members of the Von der Leyen Commission.

On 22 April 2022, European policymakers reached an agreement on the Digital Services Act. The European Parliament approved the DSA along with the Digital Markets Act on 5 July 2022. On 4 October 2022, the European Council gave its final approval to the Regulation on a Digital Services Act. It was published in the Official Journal of the European Union on the 19th of October. Affected service providers will have until 1 January 2024 to comply with its provisions. Popular online platforms and search engines will need to comply with their obligations four months after they have been designated as such by the EU Commission.

Objectives of the DSA 
Ursula von der Leyen proposed a "new Digital Services Act", in her 2019 bid for the European Commission's presidency.
The expressed purpose of the DSA is to update the European Union's legal framework for illegal content on intermediaries, in particular by modernising the e-Commerce Directive adopted in 2000. In doing so, the DSA aims to harmonise different national laws in the European Union that have emerged at national level to address illegal content. Most prominent amongst these laws has been the German NetzDG, and similar laws in Austria ("Kommunikationsplattformen-Gesetz") and France ("Loi Avia", declared unconstitutional by the Constitutional Council). With the adoption of the Digital Services Act at European level, those national laws would be overwritten and would have to be repealed.

In practice, this will mean new legislation regarding illegal content, transparent advertising and disinformation.

Preparatory phase 
The Digital Services Act builds in large parts on the non-binding Commission Recommendation 2018/314 of 1 March 2018 when it comes to illegal content on platforms. However, it goes further in addressing topics such as disinformation and other risks especially on very large online platforms. As part of the preparatory phase, the European Commission launched a public consultation on the package to gather evidence between July and September 2020. An impact assessment was published alongside the proposal on 15 December 2020 with the relevant evidence base.

New obligations on platform companies 

The DSA is meant to improve content moderation on social media platforms to address concerns about illegal content. It is organised in five chapters, with the most important Chapters regulating the liability exemption of intermediaries (Chapter 2), the obligations on intermediaries (Chapter 3), and the cooperation and enforcement framework between the commission and national authorities (Chapter 4).

The DSA proposal maintains the current rule according to which companies that host other's data are not liable for the content unless they actually know it is illegal, and upon obtaining such knowledge do not act to remove it.
This so-called "conditional liability exemption" is fundamentally different from the broad immunities given to intermediaries under the equivalent rule ("Section 230 CDA") in the United States.

In addition to the liability exemptions, the DSA would introduce a wide-ranging set of new obligations on platforms, including some that aim to disclose to regulators how their algorithms work, while other obligations would create transparency on how decisions to remove content are taken and on the way advertisers target users.

A November 16, 2021 Internet Policy Review listed some of new obligations including mandatory "notice-and-action" requirements, for example, respect fundamental rights, mandatory redress for content removal decisions, and a comprehensive risk management and audit framework.

A December 2020 Time article said that while many of its provisions only apply to platforms which have more than 45 million users in the European Union, the Act could have repercussions beyond Europe. Platforms including Facebook, Google's subsidiary YouTube, Twitter and TikTok would meet that threshold and be subjected to the new obligations. Companies that do not comply with the new obligations risk fines of up to 6% on their annual turnover in the European Union.

Legislative history 

The European Parliament appointed Danish Social Democrat Christel Schaldemose as rapporteur for the Digital Services Act. On 20 January 2022 the Parliament voted to introduce amendments in the DSA for tracking-free advertising and a ban on using a minor's data for targeted ads, as well as a new right for users to seek compensation for damages. In the wake of the Facebook Files revelations and a hearing by Facebook Whistleblower Frances Haugen in the European Parliament, the European Parliament also strengthened the rules on fighting disinformation and harmful content, as well as tougher auditing requirements.

The Council of the European Union adopted its position on 25 November 2021. The most significant changes introduced by the Member States are to entrust the European Commission with the enforcement of the new rules, in the wake of allegations and complaints that the Irish Data Protection Watchdog was not effectively policing the bloc's data protection rules against platform companies.

The Data Governance Act (DGA) was formally approved by the European Parliament on April 6, 2022. This sets up a legal framework for common data spaces in Europe which will increase data sharing in sectors such as finance, health, and the environment.

With Russia using social media platforms to spread misinformation about the 2022 Russian invasion of Ukraine, European policymakers felt a greater sense of urgency to move the legislation forward to ensure that major tech platforms were transparent and properly regulated, according to The Washington Post. On 22 April 2022, the Council of the European Union and the European Parliament reached a deal on the Digital Services Act in Brussels following sixteen hours of negotiations. According to The Washington Post, the agreement reached in Brussels solidifies the two-bill plan the Digital Services Act and the Digital Markets Act, a law regulating competition. The latter is aimed at preventing abuse of power against smaller competitors by larger "gatekeepers". The next stage before the bills become law, is the votes from the Parliament and policymakers from EU 27 nations. This is considered to be a formality.

Reactions 
Media reactions to the Digital Services Act have been generally positive. In January 2022, the editorial board of The Washington Post stated that the U.S. could learn from these rules, while whistleblower Frances Haugen stated that it could set a "gold standard" of regulation worldwide. Tech journalist Casey Newton has argued that the Digital Services Act will shape US tech policy. Techdirt criticized the Digital Services Act, calling it the "EU's technocratic desire to overregulate the internet" that will "cause real problems" and argued that the DSA would stifle innovation.

Scholars have begun critically examining the Digital Services Act. Some academics have expressed concerns that the Digital Services Act might be too rigid and prescribed, excessively focused on individual content decisions or vague risk assessments.

Civil Society organisations such as Electronic Frontier Foundation have called for stronger privacy protections. Human Rights Watch has welcomed the transparency and user remedies but called for an end to abusive surveillance and profiling. Amnesty International has welcomed many aspects of the proposal in terms of fundamental rights balance, but also asked for further restrictions on advertising. Advocacy organisation Avaaz has compared the Digital Services Act to the Paris Agreement for climate change.

Tech companies have repeatedly criticised the heavy burden of the rules and the alleged lack of clarity of the Digital Services Act, and have been accused of lobbying to undermine some of the more far-reaching demands by law-makers, notably on bans for targeted advertising, and a high-profile apology from Sundar Pichai to Thierry Breton on leaked plans by Google to lobby against the Digital Services Act.

A bipartisan group of US senators have called the DSA and DMA discriminatory,  claiming that the legislation  would "[focus on] regulations on a handful of American companies while failing to regulate similar companies based in Europe, China, Russia and elsewhere."

The DSA was mostly welcomed by the European media sector. Due to the influence gatekeepers have in selecting and controlling the visibility of certain journalistic articles over others through their online platforms, the European Federation of Journalists encouraged EU legislators to further increase the transparency of platforms' recommendation systems via the DSA.

Nevertheless, the DSA's later stage inter-institutional negotiations, or Trilogues, have been criticized as lacking transparency and equitable participation. These criticisms mirror past experiences with the drafting of the EU Regulation on Preventing the Dissemination of Terrorist Content Online as well as the General Data Protection Regulation (GDPR).

Swedish MEP Jessica Stegrud argued that the DSA's focus on preventing the spread of disinformation and "harmful content" would undermine freedom of speech.

See also 

 Digital Markets Act
 Trade and Technology Council
 Big Tech
Platform economy

References

External links 
 European Commission: The Digital Services Act
 Regulation (EU) 2022/2065 of 19 October 2022 on a Single Market For Digital Services on EUR-Lex
 Procedure 2020/0361(COD) on ŒIL

2020 in law
2020 in the European Union
E-commerce in the European Union
European Digital Strategy
Policies of the European Union
Draft European Union laws
European Union regulations